Annadata may refer to:

 Annadata (1952 film)
 Annadata (1954 film), a 1954 Telugu film directed by Vedantam Raghavaiah
 Annadata (1972 film), a 1972 Hindi film directed by Asit Sen
 Annadata (2002 film), a 2002 Bengali film directed by Ravi Kinagi